Constitution Drafting Assembly of Thailand, or, in brief, CDA, is a legislative body in Thailand bearing the duty to draw up a permanent Constitution of the Kingdom of Thailand. This kind of Assembly has usually been established after a military junta seized power in the country or by reason of the need to solve political crises in the country.

The Constitution of the Kingdom of Thailand, BE 2492 (1949) was the first constitution having been prepared by the CDA.

1996 

Under the premiership of Banharn Silpa-Archa, there were public demands to have the politics reformed and the constitution amended. The Government then caused a CDA to be established by amending the Constitution of the Kingdom of Thailand, BE 2534 (1991) to make provisions for having a new constitution.

At that time, the CDA established consisted of 99 members being 76 deputies elected by citizens of 76 Chanagwats, and 23 academicians from higher education institutes.

Bhumibol Adulyadej appointed Uthai Phimchaichon as the CDA President.

The success of the CDA was the well-known Constitution of the Kingdom of Thailand, BE 2540 (1997).

2007 

The CDA has been established once again after the Constitution of the Kingdom of Thailand, BE 2540 (1997) has been abrogated by the Council for Democratic Reform (CDR), a military junta which seized power in 2006. 

It consisted of 100 members, being 28 from the public service sector, 27 from the private sector, 23 from the social sector and 22 from the academic sector, or being 10 from the northern region, 68 from the central region, 12 from the eastern region and 10 from the southern region.

Such 100 members were selected on 27 December 2006 by the CDR from the nominations submitted by the National People's Assembly, and appointed by Bhumibol Adulyadej on 2007, 1 January. The King's royal command appointing CDA members was countersigned by the CDR Leader Sonthi Boonyaratglin. The members selected amongst themselves Noranit Setthabut as their President, Decho Sawananon, their 1st Vice President and Kroekkiat Phiphatseritham, their 2nd Vice President.

Thai mass media gave the CDA a nickname "saep sanit sit khomocho" ("Tart Sons of CNS").

The success of the CDA was the Constitution of the Kingdom of Thailand, BE 2550 (2007).

References 

Constitution of Thailand
Political history of Thailand